Kiss is the debut studio album by American rock band Kiss, released on February 18, 1974. Much of the material on the album was written by Gene Simmons and Paul Stanley, as members of their pre-Kiss band Wicked Lester. Simmons estimated that the entire process of recording and mixing took three weeks, while co-producer Richie Wise has stated it took just 13 days.

Album information
The album was recorded at Bell Sound Studios in New York City, which was owned by the company that owned Buddah Records. Neil Bogart, the founder of Casablanca Records, was an executive at Buddah before forming Casablanca. Casablanca Records held a party at the Century Plaza Hotel in Los Angeles to celebrate the West Coast release of Kiss (February 8) and to introduce the record company to the press and other record industry executives.

The original release of the album did not include "Kissin' Time". It has been on every pressing since. There were approximately 100,000 copies of the original pressing without "Kissin' Time" on it.

In keeping with the Casablanca theme, the party included palm trees and a Humphrey Bogart lookalike. Kiss performed their usual loud and bombastic stage show, which turned Warner Bros. Records (Casablanca's record distributor) against the group. Soon after the show, Warner Bros. contacted Neil Bogart and threatened to end their deal with Casablanca if Kiss did not remove their makeup. With manager Bill Aucoin's backing, Kiss refused. Shortly after the release of Kiss, Warner Bros. released Casablanca from their contract.

Kiss began their first album tour with a performance at the Northern Alberta Jubilee Auditorium in Edmonton, Alberta, on February 5, 1974. A few weeks later, they made their first national TV appearance on ABC's In Concert (aired March 29, 1974), performing "Nothin to Lose", "Firehouse", and "Black Diamond", followed by a performance of "Firehouse" on The Mike Douglas Show (also aired March 29, 1974). During the interview portion of the show, Gene Simmons declared himself to be "evil incarnate", eliciting nervousness, confused reactions from the studio audience, to which comedian Totie Fields humorously commented, "Wouldn't it be funny if he's just a nice Jewish boy underneath the makeup?" Although neither confirming or denying his Jewish heritage, Simmons replied, "You should only know", to which, Fields countered, "I do. You can't hide the hook", referring to Simmons' nose.

The album's cover showed the group positioned against a black background in a pose visually reminiscent of the Beatles' With the Beatles album. Three of the four band members applied their own makeup for the album cover photo, as they usually did, but Criss' "Catman" makeup was applied by a professional, whose work came out looking quite a bit different from the look Criss had established, and to which he would return immediately afterward. Ace Frehley, wanting to impress the other members of Kiss, dyed his hair with silver hairspray, which easily came out with shampoo. According to Criss, photographer Joel Brodsky thought Kiss were literally clowns and wanted to place balloons behind the group for the shoot. Brodsky denied this, chalking it up to their imagination.

Composition
All of the material for Kiss was written before the band entered the studio. Some of the songs were written during Wicked Lester's brief existence, while "Firehouse" was written by Paul Stanley while he was attending the High School of Music & Art in New York City.

"Strutter"
"Strutter", which opens the album with a drum intro, is an uptempo rock song that was written before Frehley joined Kiss. Stanley wrote the lyrics, and the music was based on a song Simmons had written years before, "Stanley the Parrot", which he had recorded with former Wicked Lester member Brooke Ostrander in a New Jersey apartment. "Strutter" remains one of the few Kiss songs where Stanley and Simmons share songwriting credits and was a standard number at Kiss concerts throughout the 1970s. It was released in August 1974 as the third and final single from the album.

"Nothin' to Lose"
"Nothin' to Lose" became the band's first single; it was written by Simmons. Verses were performed by Simmons and Stanley, with Peter Criss providing scat vocals for the chorus. It chronicles the singer coercing his girlfriend into trying anal sex, and her subsequent enjoyment of it. The B-side was "Love Theme from KISS", the album's instrumental.

"Firehouse"
Simmons performed fire breathing during this song at live concerts.

"Cold Gin"
This was the first song composed for Kiss by Frehley. Insecure in his singing ability, Frehley turned over the vocals for the album to Simmons. "Cold Gin" was a concert staple throughout the 1970s. During the Alive/Worldwide Tour, Frehley assisted on lead vocals.

The song refers to the stimulating effect that cold gin supposedly has on the male sex drive. The song credits cold gin as the only thing that keeps the couple together in a troubled relationship.

There was a Kiss tribute band from Los Angeles named after this classic song, featuring Tommy Thayer as Frehley, Jaime St. James as Criss, Chris McLernon as Simmons and Anthony White as Stanley. St. James and Thayer previously played in Black 'N Blue, a band produced by Simmons, and Thayer would eventually join Kiss, taking Frehley's place after the Farewell tour.

A live version of the song was included on Kiss' popular and successful live album Alive!. When Alive! was re-released as part of the Kiss Alive! 1975–2000 box set, the song was mistakenly credited to Stanley instead of Ace Frehley in the 72-page booklet that accompanied the album.

"Cold Gin" was named the seventh-best drinking song by Guitar World staff.

Ace Frehley later rerecorded "Cold Gin" with his vocals for his cover album, Origins, Vol. 1.

"Let Me Know"
"Let Me Know" (previously titled "Sunday Driver") was the song Stanley played when he was first introduced to Simmons, and it was later recorded by Wicked Lester. Simmons and Stanley shared lead vocal duties on the song, which was given a bridge and instrumental coda when recorded for Kiss. During later Kiss concerts, this coda was moved to the end of "She" and before that, "Watchin' You".

"Kissin' Time"
"Kissin' Time" was not included on the original album; it was not recorded until two months after the album's February release. By April, the album was clearly not the commercial success that the band and Casablanca Records founder Bogart was hoping for. Bogart (who knew that a catchy single could save the album) ordered Kiss back into the studio to record "Kissin' Time", which was a Top 20 hit for Bobby Rydell in 1959. It was released as a single on May 10, but never reached any higher than No. 83. It did, however, boost sales of the album, even though it was not added to the track listing until the album was reissued in July 1974 (against the band's wishes).

"Deuce"
Simmons has stated that he does not know the meaning of the song's lyrics. "Deuce" has been a staple of the band's concerts, opening their shows from 1973–1976 and again for their 1996 reunion.

"Love Theme from Kiss"
This instrumental evolved from a song titled "Acrobat", played during the band's 1973 club shows. It can be found on their 2001 box set. The song is shortened for the album. It is the only Kiss song to feature songwriting credits for all four original members. "Love Theme from Kiss" appeared in the 2010 movie Somewhere, directed by Sofia Coppola.

"100,000 Years"
"100,000 Years" begins with a bass riff by Simmons. The live version includes a long drum solo by Criss continuing from the short one found on the album, as heard on Alive! The demo version can be heard on the 2001 release of the Kiss box set. 

"Black Diamond"
"Black Diamond" begins with Stanley singing the intro accompanied by a twelve-string acoustic guitar. After he yells out "hit it!", the full band kicks in and Criss assumes lead vocal duties for the two verses. After the last chorus, the song transitions to 3/4 time for Frehley's guitar solo, then ends with repeated 'A' chords as the tape is gradually slowed during mixing. After Criss departed from the band, the vocal duties have fallen to subsequent drummers Eric Carr and Eric Singer.

Later re-pressings
In the mid-late 1980s, the album was reissued by Mercury Records on vinyl and cassette with a live version of "Nothin' to Lose" (from Alive!) in place of the studio version. This substitution was reportedly done unauthorized by a malicious employee at PolyGram Records' tape library. The studio version was restored when the album was issued on CD and the 2014 vinyl re-issue.

Reception
Despite the band's promoting and touring, Kiss sold approximately 75,000 copies after its initial release without the presence of a hit single. It was certified gold on June 8, 1977, having shipped 500,000 copies. The album was re-released in 1997 (along with most of Kiss' earlier albums) in a remastered version.

In 2003, Kiss was included in the Spin list of essential glam rock albums.

Gene Simmons & Ace Frehley have stated that Kiss is their favorite Kiss album.

Track listing
All credits adapted from the original release.

Personnel
Kiss
Paul Stanley – rhythm guitar, vocals
Gene Simmons – bass, vocals
Peter Criss – drums, vocals
Ace Frehley – lead guitar, backing vocals on "Nothin' to Lose" and "Black Diamond"

Additional personnel
Bruce Foster – acoustic piano, additional guitar
Warren Dewey – fire engine on "Firehouse", engineer

Production
Kenny Kerner, Richie Wise – producers
Joe Brescio – mastering
Robert Lockart – art director, design
Joel Brodsky – photography

Charts

Weekly charts

Singles
Kissin' Time

Certifications

References

External links
 

1974 debut albums
Casablanca Records albums
Kiss (band) albums
Albums with cover art by Joel Brodsky